The Logan Institute of Religion is the largest institute of religion in the world, and the oldest in Utah. This facility is operated by the Church of Jesus Christ of Latter-day Saints (LDS Church). It is located in Logan, Utah, adjacent to the campus of Utah State University (USU). The institute provides religion classes to young adults age 18-30, serves as a meetinghouse for local congregations, and sponsors activities for young adults.

History

Building Construction 
The Logan Institute was first opened in 1929, and has since been expanded with five additions. This has led to the building-block feel as different sections were added over time.

List of Additions

1929 - When the institute opened, the structure contained a single chapel, lounge, library, and classrooms.
1938 - Addition introduced a ballroom, game room, and two kitchens. An apartment was also added to house the institute director and his family. The director's residence has now been repurposed for use as office space.
1960 - The institute was doubled in size with a second chapel, six more classrooms, a cultural hall, and offices.
1977 - A larger library, student lounge, and instructors' offices were all added.
1990 - The southeast section of the building was added with six classrooms and offices for local church leaders.
1994 - The most recent addition added a full-size gymnasium used for sports, social events, and weekly devotionals.
2023 (planned) - It is anticipated the building will be demolished in early 2023, with a new building to be constructed over the following 2 years.

Other History 

Construction on the Logan Institute began in 1928 as the first institute of religion in the state of Utah. When the building was completed, it was dedicated by LDS Church president Heber J. Grant on Easter Sunday, 31 March 1929. When it opened, there was a total enrollment of 114 students and offered two classes: Bible Literature and Moral Philosophy. The institute's first class graduated on 26 May 1935 and had 21 students. Thomas C. Romney was the first institute director and the only instructor until Milton R. Hunter was hired in 1936.

On 25 January 2012, the building suffered from a minor fire that started in the second floor kitchen. The fire began when a box of apples was left on a stove burner, causing $18,000 in damages. This prompted upgrades to the structure, including adding a sprinkler system to the building's upper level.

Features

Organs 

The institute's west chapel contains a hybrid organ built by Anderson Organ Works with twenty-nine stops. Twenty-one of the stops are voiced by six ranks of pipes, with the remaining eight voices provided by speakers located within the swell box. The swell box also houses a rank of chimes, although the chimes are not playable from the current organ console.

The institute has an additional three electronic organs: one in the east chapel; one in the gym used for weekly devotionals; and one that travels with the institute choirs. Throughout the building there are also five grand pianos, and various upright pianos located in classrooms.

Art and Artifacts 
The Joseph Smith Student Lounge has a 10' x 26' mural of the sacred grove painted by Kent Wallis. The west chapel previously had a stained glass window, but after renovations the window is now only visible from the attic area. The library is the largest in the state for an institute of religion and contains several items of historic value, including an original copy of the Book of Mormon and a 1906 sacrament set from the Mendon ward.

Student Involvement

Student Council 
Student activities and events at the institute are organized by the local chapter of the Latter-day Saint Student Association (LDSSA). According to the Encyclopedia of Mormonism, LDSSA is "an organization which sponsors social, religious, and recreational activities for LDS college students and their friends." It was organized in 1966, with Richard Eyre serving as its first president.

LDSSA is led by the Logan Institute Student Council. The student council consists of seven presidencies who each lead a different LDSSA committee.

As of the 2022, the Logan LDSSA consists of the following committees:
 Multimedia
 Recreation
 Just Serve
 Publicity
 Proclaim the Gospel
 Feed My Sheep
 Dance
 Campus Relations
 Ambassadors

Choirs 
The Logan Institute's first choir, the Delta Phi Chorus, was organized in 1957 to serve as "ambassadors of good will for the institute." Today, the institute has two different choirs: the Logan Institute Choir and the Logan Institute Singers (formally the Latter-day Voices). The Logan Institute Choir is open for all students to join, and typically has 200-300 members. The Logan Institute Singers is by audition only, and will travel to perform in other venues, such as in seminaries.

The two choirs often combine to perform for special events such as semiannual concerts, the Joseph Smith Memorial Devotional, and for events held on Temple Square in Salt Lake City. The combined choir has performed for several worldwide young adult devotionals held in the Salt Lake Tabernacle when church general authorities have spoken, such as Lynn G. Robbins (2015) and Carl B. Cook (May 2019). A choir from the Logan Institute also performed in the priesthood session of the church's general conference in April 2016.

Devotionals

Religion in Life 
Religion in Life devotionals are held weekly in the gymnasium. Often, speakers are local church leaders or other influential figures. Other members of the community have also spoken such as when USU president Noelle E. Cockett spoke in September 2017.

Joseph Smith Memorial Devotional 
The Joseph Smith Memorial devotional series is held annually in honor of Smith, founder of the Latter Day Saint movement. It is scheduled as close as possible to 23 December, Smith's birthday, and is usually held in USU's Smith Spectrum. The first devotional was held in 1944, and past speakers have included all who have served as church presidents since that time.

References 



Seminaries and theological colleges in the United States